Paprika Rádió is a Hungarian language radio station broadcasting in Cluj-Napoca, Romania.

External links
Official website

Radio stations in Romania
Hungarian-language radio stations
Mass media in Cluj-Napoca